The HSV Dealer Team, previously known as Tom Walkinshaw Racing Australia and John Kelly Racing, was an Australian V8 Supercar team. The team ceased operations at the end of 2008, with Walkinshaw Racing and Kelly Racing being formed by owners and staff of the former team. The team is best known for winning the Bathurst 1000 in 2003 and 2004 and the V8 Supercars Drivers & Teams Championships in 2006 and 2007.

History

Tom Walkinshaw Racing Australia and John Kelly Racing
The team was formed in 2001 (commercially known as K-Mart Racing Team) when Tom Walkinshaw Racing expanded its Holden Racing Team operation to four cars. Because a team could only race three cars under a Racing Entitlement Contract (REC) at the time, Romano Racing's REC was leased for the two K-Mart cars with the Romano car entered as a third Holden Racing Team car under the Holden Young Lions banner.

Todd Kelly who had driven a third HRT entry under the Holden Young Lions banner in 2000 drove one car, with the second driven by Greg Murphy who moved with the K-Mart sponsorship from Gibson Motorsport. The team achieved its first success in winning the final two rounds of the 2001 season. Murphy won his home event, the V8 International at Pukekohe Park Raceway, which was followed by Kelly winning the V8 Ultimate at Sandown Raceway, his first championship round win. Murphy would go on to win the Pukekohe event again for the team in 2002 and 2003.

For 2003 the cars were entered under a REC leased from John Faulkner Racing with Rick Kelly replacing brother Todd. Following the February 2003 collapse of Tom Walkinshaw Racing, the team was purchased by Holden before being quickly on-sold to John and Margaret Kelly, the parents of Rick and Todd, as manufacturers were barred from owning teams. In July 2003 the leased John Faulkner REC was returned (and subsequently sold to Paul Weel Racing), after one was purchased from 00 Motorsport.

Bathurst success

The team won both the 2003 and 2004 Bathurst 1000 with Murphy and Rick Kelly as co-drivers. This included being a part of one of the most famous moments in Bathurst history in 2003, with Murphy setting what became known as the 'Lap of the Gods' in the Top 10 Shootout. The lap was the fastest in circuit history at the time. In winning the 2003 race, Rick Kelly became the youngest winner in the race's history.

HSV Dealer Team

In 2005 Murphy was replaced by Garth Tander. At this point K-Mart concluded their sponsorship and the team became the HSV Dealer Team. Rick Kelly's entry was, however, rebranded as Team Buick for the V8 Supercars China Round. The team struggled through the early stages of 2005 before a late upturn in form. In 2006, Toll Group joined HSV as a title sponsor with the team becoming known as Toll HSV Dealer Team. The team then quickly became the dominant force of the championship with Rick Kelly winning the 2006 championship title and Tander doing likewise in 2007.

In 2008 Tander transferred, with the Toll sponsorship, to the Holden Racing Team and was replaced by Paul Dumbrell. As well as continuing HSV sponsorship, the team ran Autobarn colours for Dumbrell and Opes Prime colours for Kelly, Toll Group then rejoined the team midway through the season, following the collapse of Opes Prime. Rick Kelly won the team's final race at Oran Park Raceway in December 2008, which was also the final championship race held at the now-demolished circuit.

2006 co-driver swap
For the endurance races in 2006, the HSV Dealer Team and the Holden Racing Team swapped drivers, primarily to split Tander and Kelly who were both in contention for the championship (being 1st and 2nd at that point). Tander joined Mark Skaife at HRT while Todd Kelly rejoined the team. A loophole in the regulations allowed the drivers to terminate their contracts with their respective teams. However while Kelly would finish second at both Sandown and Bathurst, Tander only managed twenty-seventh at Sandown and did not finish at Bathurst. The loophole was later closed.

Demise and legacy
At the end of 2008 John Kelly announced he would end his association with Walkinshaw Performance and establish Kelly Racing, with preparation handled by Perkins Engineering. The new team expanded to four cars and featured both Kelly brothers driving in the same team for the first time. The team continues to this day, and partnered with Nissan for their return to the category in 2013. 

Walkinshaw Performance decided to continue to race four cars, forming Walkinshaw Racing in 2009 to complement the HRT entries. Dumbrell remained with the Walkinshaw operation for 2009, joined by former HSV Dealer Team endurance co-driver David Reynolds. Walkinshaw Racing folded after the 2015 season as the operation downsized to two cars.

Supercars results

Car No. 15 results

Car No. 16 results

V8 Supercar drivers
The following is a list of drivers who have driven for the team in V8 Supercars, in order of their first appearance. Drivers who only drove for the team on a part-time basis are listed in italics.

 Greg Murphy (2001–04)
 Todd Kelly (2001–02, 2006)
 Rick Kelly (2001, 2003–08)
 Nathan Pretty (2001)
 Yvan Muller (2002)
 Andy Priaulx (2002–03)
 Cameron McLean (2003)
 Tim Leahey (2004–05)
 Steve Owen (2004)
 Garth Tander (2005–07)
 Mark Noske (2005)
 Anthony Tratt (2006)
 Tony D'Alberto (2006)
 Craig Baird (2007)
 Paul Radisich (2007–08)
 Paul Dumbrell (2008)
 David Reynolds (2008)

References

External links
HSV Dealer Team website

Australian auto racing teams
Holden in motorsport
Sports teams in Victoria (Australia)
Supercars Championship teams
2001 establishments in Australia
2008 disestablishments in Australia
Auto racing teams established in 2001
Auto racing teams disestablished in 2008